Graphicomassa is a genus of sea snails, marine gastropod mollusks in the family Columbellidae.

Species
Species within the genus Graphicomassa include:
 Graphicomassa adiostina (Duclos, 1840)
 Graphicomassa ligula (Duclos, 1840)
 Graphicomassa margarita (Reeve, 1859)
Species brought into synonymy
 Graphicomassa albina (Kiener, 1841): synonym of Graphicomassa ligula (Duclos, 1840)

References

 deMaintenon M.J. (2016). On the identity of Graphicomassa albina (Kiener, 1841) (Gastropoda: Columbellidae). Zoosystema. 38(1): 43-48

External links
 Adams H. & Adams A. (1853-1858). The genera of Recent Mollusca; arranged according to their organization. London, van Voorst. Vol. 1: xl + 484 pp.; vol. 2: 661 pp.; vol. 3: 138 pls. [Published in parts: Vol. 1: i-xl (1858), 1-256 (1853), 257-484 (1854). Vol. 2: 1-92 (1854), 93-284 (1855), 285-412 (1856), 413-540 (1857), 541-661 (1858). Vol. 3: pl. 1-32 (1853), 33-96 (1855), 97-112 (1856), 113-128 (1857), 129-138 (1858) 
 Iredale, T. (1929). Queensland molluscan notes, no. 1. Memoirs of the Queensland Museum. 9(3): 261-297, pls 30-31

Columbellidae
Gastropod genera